Acalyptris limoniastri is a moth of the family Nepticulidae. It is only known from the northern borders of the Sahara in Algeria and Tunisia.

The wingspan is 5.5–6.6 mm.

The immature stages are unknown. The species was collected in 1904 from bushes of Limoniastrum guyonianum, they are also found on Limoniastrum monopetalum. These also had mines, which probably belong to this species. These mines consist of a narrow gallery following the leaf margin upwards and down again along other the side. The frass is concentrated in narrow midline.

External links
Acalyptris Meyrick: revision of the platani and staticis groups in Europe and the Mediterranean (Lepidoptera: Nepticulidae)

References

Nepticulidae
Moths of Africa
Moths described in 2007